Harold Livingstone Tapley  (25 January 1875 – 21 December 1932) was a New Zealand politician of the Reform Party.

Born in Semaphore, South Australia in 1875, Tapley emigrated to Dunedin in 1893.

He represented Dunedin North in Parliament from 1925 to 1928, when he was defeated.

He was the Mayor of Dunedin from 1923 to 1927. He was appointed a Companion of the Order of St Michael and St George in the 1926 King's Birthday Honours.

References

1875 births
1932 deaths
New Zealand Companions of the Order of St Michael and St George
Mayors of Dunedin
Reform Party (New Zealand) MPs
New Zealand MPs for Dunedin electorates
Members of the New Zealand House of Representatives
Politicians from Adelaide
Australian emigrants to New Zealand
Unsuccessful candidates in the 1928 New Zealand general election